Mark Ricardo Bell (born June 14, 1957) is a former American football wide receiver and punt returner who played two seasons in the National Football League (NFL) for the St. Louis Cardinals.

College career
Bell attended Colorado State University, and played four years with the Rams. His standout season was his junior year in 1977, during which he made 40 receptions for 797 yards and nine touchdowns, earning All-WAC team honors.

He was one of three Colorado State players with the surname Bell who were selected during the 1979 NFL Draft.

Professional career
Bell was selected in the fifth round of the 1979 NFL draft by the St. Louis Cardinals. He played parts of two seasons with the Cardinals, and was released after one game in the 1981 season.

References

External links
 NFL.com player page

1957 births
Living people
Players of American football from Youngstown, Ohio
American football wide receivers
Colorado State Rams football players
St. Louis Cardinals (football) players